

 
Bynoe Harbour is a locality in the Northern Territory of Australia located about  south-west of the territory capital of Darwin.

Bynoe Harbour consists of the full extent of the natural harbour of Bynoe Harbour which extends in an easterly direction into the mainland forming one of the sides of the Cox Peninsula and which is enclosed to the west by a spit consisting of a number of islands including Quail Island at the spit's northern end.  The mouth of the natural harbour opens to the north into Beagle Gulf.  The locality is bounded to the north by a line running across the harbour’s mouth from Birge Point on the Cox Peninsula in the east via the northern tip of Indian Island to Quail Island in the west and bounded in the west by a line from Quail Island in the north to Point Paterson in the locality of Dundee Beach in the south.  The western boundary passes on the west of the spit which includes Dum In Mirrie Island.  The locality’s name derived from the natural harbour and ultimately from Benjamin Bynoe, the surgeon and naturalist who served on HMS Beagle on its third voyage.  Its boundaries and name were gazetted on 4 April 2007.

The full extent of Indian Island which located within the natural harbour is occupied by a protected area called the Indian Island Conservation Area.  Dum In Mirrie Island has an airfield known as the Dum In Mirrie Airstrip where an automatic weather station has been in operation since 1994.

The 2016 Australian census which was conducted in August 2016 reports that Bynoe Harbour  had no people living within its boundaries.

Bynoe Harbour is located within the federal division of Lingiari, the territory electoral division of Daly and within the unincorporated areas of the Northern Territory.

References

Notes

Citations

Populated places in the Northern Territory
Places in the unincorporated areas of the Northern Territory